The following is a complete list of association football clubs based in Morocco registered at Semi Professional level or above.
For a complete list see :Category:Football clubs in Morocco

A
AS FAR (football)
Amal Club Belksiri
Association Al Mansoria
Association Salé
Association Sportive Achbal Ismailia Meknés
Atletico Tanger

C
Chabab Atlas Khénifra
Chabab Houara
Chabab Larache
Chabab Rif Al Hoceima
Chez Ali Club de Marrakech
COD Meknès

D
Difaa El Jadida

E
Étoile de Casablanca

F
Fath Riadi de Nador
FUS de Rabat

G
GNFA 1

H
Hassania Agadir
Hassania Athletic Sidi Slimane
Hassania Sportive Ben Slimane
Hilal de Nador

I
IR Tanger
Ittihad Khemisset
Ittihad Riadi Fkih Ben Salah

J
Jeunesse Olympique Ouezzane
Jeunesse Sportive de Kasbah Tadla
JS Massira

K
KAC Kénitra
KAC Marrakech

M
MAS Fez
MC Oujda
Moghreb Tétouan
Mouloudia de Marrakech

N
Nahdat Berkane
Najah Souss
Najm de Marrakech

O
OC Khouribga
OC Safi
Olympic Youssoufia
Olympique Dcheira

R
Rachad Bernoussi
Racing de Casablanca
Raja Al Hoceima
Raja Beni Mellal
Raja Club Athletic
RS Settat

S
SCC Mohammédia
Stade Marocain

T
TAS de Casablanca
Tihad Sportif Casablanca

U
Union Aït Melloul
Union de Mohammédia
Union de Touarga
Union Sidi Kacem
Union Sportive Musulmane d'Oujda
Union Sportive Yacoub el Mansour
US Témara

W
Wydad Casablanca

 
Morocco
Football
Football clubs